Suavodrillia textilia is a species of sea snail, a marine gastropod mollusk in the Suavodrillia family Borsoniidae.

Description
The Suavodrillia textilia is a Neogastropoda cone shell that grows to a length of 8mm.

Distribution
This species is found in the Western Atlantic, in the Atlantic Ocean from Georgia to Florida at depths between 538 - 805m.

Reproduction 
Members of the order Neogastropoda are mostly gonochoric and broadcast spawners. Life cycle: Embryos develop into planktonic trocophore larvae and later into juvenile veligers before becoming fully grown adults.

References

  Dall W. H. (1927). Small shells from dredgings off the southeast coast of the United states by the United States Fisheries Steamer "Albatross", in 1885 and 1886; Proceedings of the United States National Museum, 70(18): 1–134
 Sealife Base Identification Species List
 Sealife Base Species description

textilia
Gastropods described in 1927